Usutu to Mhlatuze WMA, or Usutu to Mhlatuze Water Management Area (coded: 6), in South Africa includes the following major rivers: the Usutu River, Pongola River, Mhlatuze River, Mfolozi River and Mkuze River, and covers the following Dams:

 Goedertrouw Dam Mhlatuze River 
 Heyshope Dam Assegaai River 
 Hluhluwe Dam Hluhluwe River 
 Jericho Dam Mpama River 
 Klipfontein Dam Wit Mfolozi River 
 Morgenstond Dam Ngwempisi River 
 Pongolapoort Dam Phongolo River 
 Westoe Dam Usutu River

Boundaries 
Primary drainage region W.

References 

Water Management Areas
Dams in South Africa